This is a list of Bien de Interés Cultural landmarks in the Province of León, Spain.

List 

 Church of Grisuela del Páramo
 Monastery of Carracedo
 Monastery of San Miguel de Escalada
 León Cathedral

References 

 
León